Strijp-S is a neighborhood and former industrial park in the  Eindhoven district of Strijp. The area belonged to electronics company Philips. Since 2000, creative companies and housing have been established in the former industrial buildings. Eindhoven Strijp-S railway station serves the district.

Name 
The name Strijp-S comes from the naming pattern that Philips used in its industrial parks. Strijp-S was the first park, and Strijp-T and Strijp-R followed.

History

Lamps, radios and televisions 
In 1916 Anton Philips built the first factory in Strijp-S a glass factory for incandescent light bulbs. The Philips Natuurkundig Laboratorium was opened in 1914. Strijp-S was where first radios, then televisions were produced, as well as many other devices. The credo Van zand tot klant ("from sand to customer") stood behind the idea that Philips controlled every phase of production from research to storage, from glass blowing to cardboard factory: everything on one enormous piece of land.

Departure of Philips 
In the 1990s Philips gradually left Eindhoven and in 2000 the first discussions took place about the repurposing of Strijp-S. In 2002 the land was sold for €140 million to Park Strijp Beheer B.V., a public private partnership between the city of Eindhoven and VolkerWessels. Philips was able to lease some of the buildings back temporarily until its full withdrawal in 2006, although there are still two small Philips departments present in the buildings SFH en SEY.

Adaptive reuse and Strijp-S today

Project for adaptive reuse 
With the departure of Philips the plans was implemented to make the area a broad destination for the creative sector, including technology and design, under the English headline Old Buildings, New Ideas. The old factory buildings would be perfect for studios. In 2016 the creative school St. Lucas opened at Strijp-S.

Residential 
In 2012 Strijp-S got its first permanent residents, when the SAS-3 project was completed (new construction). A year later the repurposed industrial SAN en SBP buildings were ready for residential use. Lofts replaced former television factories. The buildings were renamed GERARD and ANTON, in honor of two prominenta members of the Philips family. Many other residential complexes are planned such as Space-S and Blok 61, 63 and 59. A year later the industrial buildings SAN and SBP were also ready for residential use.

The profile of the residents skews very young, with 78.2% of the residents are between 20 and 34 versus 24.6% in Eindhoven as a whole.

Restaurants, cafés, bars 
In the Veemgebouw in 2015 the food hall Vershal Het Veem  opened.

Arts and culture 
At Strijp-S you can visit MU Hybrid Art House (Torenallee 40-06). MU is all about art in the broadest sense of the word. Together with mainly young makers and a broad, international audience, MU defines the liminal space between ‘what art is and what art can be’. 

Furthermore, the De Ontdekfabriek  is located at Strijp-S: a children's science discovery space.

Events 
Strijp-S is a major event space, in the halls of the Klokgebouw building, but also larger events on the Ketelhuisplein plaza. For example, dance festival Flying Dutch in 2015 attracted 25,000 visitors.  Dutch Design Week takes place each October. Every third Sunday of the month Strijp-S hosts the FeelGood Markt market.

Sports 
Strijp-S is a magnet for urban sports. Skateboarding, BMX and bouldering as well as bootcamp classes.

Light Art 
Strijp-S is a place for experimentation with LED lighting, which keeps the historic connection with Philips' past.  Some light art includes the project Fakkel by Har Hollands. In the underground passage to NatLab artist Daan Roosegaarde installed his project Crystal.

Strijp-S is a regular location for the light festival GLOW.

Points of interest 

 Philips Natuurkundig Laboratorium or NatLab
 Klokgebouw  ("Clock building")
 Hoge Rug. Three industrial buildings from 1927, 1929 and 1930
 Ketelhuis ("Kettle House") and Machinekamer ("Machine Room") from 1929.
 Veemgebouw ("Warehouse Building") from 1942 where tvs, radios and other items were warehoused.
 Leidingstraat ("Cable Street"). A network of cables ten meters high where once gas and other liquids flowed. Here is a garden by Piet Oudolf, and the light art by Har Hollands.
 Torenallee ("Tower Avenue"). A wide boulevard for strolling.
 SPACE-S. 7 colorful residential blocks decorated by the residents themselves, 402 residences in total.

Official website
Strijp-S website

References

Philips
Neighbourhoods of Eindhoven
Adaptive reuse of industrial structures in the Netherlands
Mixed-use developments in the Netherlands